The women's pole vault at the 2012 World Junior Championships in Athletics was held at the Estadi Olímpic Lluís Companys on 12 and 14 July.

The 2010 world junior champion, Angelica Bengtsson of Sweden, is eligible to defend her title.

Medalists

Records
, the existing world junior and championship records were as follows.

Results

Qualification

Qualification: Standard 4.10 m (Q) or at least best 12 qualified (q)

Final

Participation
According to an unofficial count, 29 athletes from 20 countries participated in the event.

References

External links

Pole Vault
Pole vault at the World Athletics U20 Championships
2012 in women's athletics